Michał Grabowski of the Oksza coat of arms (1773 – 17 August 1812) was a brigadier general of the Army of Duchy of Warsaw.

Early life 
He was the natural son of the King of Poland, Stanisław August Poniatowski and Elizabeth Grabowska, from the house Szydłowska and brother of Stanislaw Grabowski.

He stayed under the care of  the King Stanisław August Poniatowski which was on the alert of the course of his army career.

1790s 
During the 1792 war with Russia, he was a major of the 5th Regiment of Fusiliers. In 1794, during the Kościuszko Uprising, as the adjutant he stayed in surrounding the king. After the Third Partition he kept which company in Hrodna and Saint Petersburg.

Napoleonic Wars 
He participated in the campaign of 1807, commanding the 1st Infantry Regiment in Poniatowski's Division. Appointed brigadier general, became a commanding officer of the fort in Gdańsk, and a little bit later became a commanding officer of the Modlin Fortress, which was still being built. In 1808 he was a commander of the brigade in of 3 Divisions. From 1809-1810 he commanded the Danzig garrison under Jean Rapp.

In 1811 he was sent in a military mission to the Dresden. In 1812, during the expedition of Napoleon to Russia, he commanded the 1st Brigade of Kniaziewicz's 18th Division in the V Corps. 4 July 1812, in Hrodna, signed the accession to the general confederacy of the Congress Kingdom of Poland established in 1815 at the Congress of Vienna. He was appointed the governor of Mogilev. On 17 August 1812, he was killed during the Battle of Smolensk.

External links
  Michal Grabowski (1773 - 1812)   Polish

1773 births
1812 deaths
Illegitimate children of Polish monarchs
Polish military personnel killed in action
Polish commanders of the Napoleonic Wars
Military personnel killed in the Napoleonic Wars
Poniatowski family
Szydłowski family
Sons of kings